The Comoros women's national football team is the national women's football team of Comoros and is overseen by the Comoros Football Federation. They played their first match on 28 October 2006.

History

The beginning
Comoros played its first ever international match against Mozambique and was played in Maputo, on 28 October 2006. The result was a 7–2 loss.

They had scheduled two matches against Mozambique in February 2014, for the 2014 African Women's Championship qualification, but it withdrew. Comoros advanced by walkover to the Second Round against South Africa on 23 May 2014 which they lost 13–0. They then had withdrawn from the return leg.

In December 2016 two friendlies against Madagascar were lost 0–4 each.                                                             In the 2019 COSAFA Women's Championship, in July, Comoros suffered their worst loss to South Africa, a match which ended 13–0.

At the 2020 COSAFA Women's Championship, the national team suffered a 4–2 loss to Eswatini and a 7–0 loss to South Africa, but managed a 1–1 draw against Angola, being its first result in its history.

Team image

Home stadium
The Comoros women's national football team play its home matches on the Stade Said Mohamed Cheikh.

Results and fixtures

The following is a list of match results in the last 12 months, as well as any future matches that have been scheduled.

Legend

2022

2023

 Fixtures and Results – Soccerway.com
 Fixtures and Results – FIFA.com
globalsportsarchive

Coaching staff

Current coaching staff

Manager history

Choudjay Mahandhi (????–2022)
 Mohamed Bouhari (2022-)

Players

Current squad
 The following 24 players were called up for the 2023 SAFF Women's Friendly Tournament held from 11 to 19 January 2023.

Recent call-ups
The following players have been called up to a Comoros squad in the past 12 months.

Previous squads
COSAFA Women's Championship
2020 COSAFA Women's Championship squad
2022 COSAFA Women's Championship squad

Records

Active players in bold, statistics correct as of 20 May 2021.

Most capped players

Top goalscorers

Competitive record

FIFA Women's World Cup

Olympic Games

*Draws include knockout matches decided on penalty kicks.

Africa Women Cup of Nations

African Games

Regional

COSAFA Women's Championship

*Draws include knockout matches decided on penalty kicks.

Honours

All−time record against FIFA recognized nations
The list shown below shows the Comoros women's national football team all−time international record against opposing nations.
*As of xxxxxx after match against  xxxx. Update using wiki page still friendly match 1/1/2022
Key

Record per opponent
*As ofxxxxx after match against  xxxxx.
Key

The following table shows Sudan's all-time official international record per opponent:

See also

Sport in the Comoros
Football in the Comoros
Women's football in the Comoros
Comoros women's national under-20 football team
Comoros women's national under-17 football team
Comoros men's national football team

References

External links
Official website
FIFA Profile

َArabic women's national association football teams
 
African women's national association football teams